Orthops basalis is a species of plant bugs belonging to the family Miridae, subfamily Mirinae that can be found everywhere in Europe except for Azores, Bosnia and Herzegovina Faroe Islands, Iceland and Cyprus.<ref>{{cite web|url=http://www.faunaeur.org/full_results.php?id=452077|archive-url=https://web.archive.org/web/20131014172810/http://www.faunaeur.org/full_results.php?id=452077|url-status=dead|archive-date=October 14, 2013|title=Orthops (Orthops) basalis (A. Costa, 1853)|publisher=Fauna Europaea|version=2.6.2|date=August 29, 2013|accessdate=October 14, 2013}}</ref> then east across the Palearctic to Central Asia and Siberia.

Description

BiologyO. basalis'' lives on various Apiaceae and have no specialization in certain genera.  Both the nymphs and the adult bugs are often on the flowers, especially on the stems directly below the flowers.  There they suck on the immature reproductive organs.

References

External links
Orthops basalis

Insects described in 1853
Hemiptera of Europe
Mirini
Taxa named by Achille Costa